The 2017–18 National League 2 North is the ninth season (31st overall) of the fourth tier (north) of the English domestic rugby union competitions since the professionalised format of the second division was introduced.  

On 21 April 2018 Sheffield became the first side to be relegated after losing heavily to promotion chasing Sedgley Park away from home.  This meant that Sheffield would equal the unwanted record set by Morley of being the most demoted side in tier 4 (north) history with what was their third relegation from this level since the leagues started in 1987.  The championship took a little longer to decide when on 28 April 2018 Sale FC clinched the title by winning 37-5 away to Leicester Lions, with a (rescheduled) game to spare.  Sale FC were deserving winners, although runners up Sedgley Park kept the title race going to the wire thanks to their outstanding bonus points tally of 30 (a divisional record), helping Park to the runners up spot and a place in the promotion playoff game.  On the same day the second relegation spot was sealed when Blaydon suffered their second successive relegation, losing a tight game 36-40 at Kingston Park to Hinckley.  

Runners up Sedgley Park failed to join Sale FC in the 2018–19 National League 1 after they lost 30-41 away to 2017–18 National League 2 South runners up Chinnor in the promotion play-off game played on 5 May 2018.  Due to poor weather causing delays to the end of the season it took till 12 May 2018 to determine the final relegation spot with Luctonians losing 21-22 to champions Sale FC at home in their re-arranged fixture, condemning the Herefordshire side to the drop, 3 points below 13th placed Wharfedale, who could have gone down instead had Luctonians won via a bonus point.

Structure
The league consists of sixteen teams with all the teams playing each other on a home and away basis to make a total of thirty matches each. There is one automatic promotion place, one play-off place and three relegation places. The champions are promoted to the 2018–19 National League 1 and the runners up play the second-placed team in the 2017–18 National League 2 South with the winner also being promoted. The last three teams are relegated to either North Premier or Midlands Premier depending on the geographical location of the team (in some cases teams may join the southern regional leagues).

The results of the matches contribute points to the league as follows:
 4 points are awarded for a win
 2 points are awarded for a draw
 0 points are awarded for a loss, however
 1 losing (bonus) point is awarded to a team that loses a match by 7 points or fewer
 1 additional (bonus) point is awarded to a team scoring 4 tries or more in a match.

Participating teams and locations
Eleven of the teams listed below participated in the 2016–17 National League 2 North season. The 2016–17 champions, Caldy, were promoted into the 2017–18 National League 1, replacing Blaydon and Macclesfield who were relegated from the 2016–17 National League 1. The three teams relegated last season were Preston Grasshoppers and Harrogate (both to North Premier) and Scunthorpe (Midlands Premier).  

The promoted teams are Huddersfield, who were promoted as champions of National League 3 North (now North Premier) and Sheffield (play-offs) who came up from National League 3 Midlands (now Midlands Premier). Broadstreet (champions of National League 3 Midlands) would have usually have come into this division but due to an imbalance of teams they were instead level transferred to the 2017–18 National League 2 South as they were considered the most southerly team in the division.

League table

Results

Round 1

Round 2

Round 3

Round 4

Round 5

Round 6

Round 7

Round 8

Round 9

Round 10

Round 11

Round 12 

Postponed due to bad weather.  Game rescheduled for 24 February 2018.

Round 13

Round 14 

 
Postponed due to bad weather (snow).  Game rescheduled to 24 February 2018.

Postponed due to bad weather (snow).  Game rescheduled to 24 February 2018.

Postponed due to bad weather (snow).  Game rescheduled to 17 March 2018.

Round 15 

Postponed due to unplayable pitch caused by recent bad weather.  Game rescheduled to 24 February 2018.

Postponed due to unplayable pitch caused by bad weather.  Game rescheduled to 17 March 2018.

Postponed due to frozen pitch caused by bad weather.  Game rescheduled to 24 February 2018.

Round 16

Round 17

Round 18

Round 19 

Postponed due to snow.  Game rescheduled for 31 March 2018.

Round 20

Round 21 

Postponed due to unplayable pitch caused by heavy rain.  Game to be rescheduled for 5 May 2018.

Game postponed due to unplayable pitch caused by rain.  Game to be rescheduled for 17 March 2018.

Round 22 

Postponed due to semi-frozen and waterlogged pitch caused by bad weather (rain and snow).  Game to be rescheduled for 31 March 2018.

Round 23

Rounds 12, 14 & 15 (rescheduled games) 

Game rescheduled from 16 December 2017.

Game rescheduled from 9 December 2017.

Game rescheduled from 9 December 2017.

Game rescheduled from 16 December 2017.

Game rescheduled from 25 November 2017.

Round 24 

Postponed due to bad weather (snow).  Game to be rescheduled for 31 March 2018.

Postponed due to bad weather (snow).  Game to be rescheduled for 12 May 2018.

Postponed due to bad weather (snow).  Game to be rescheduled for 17 March 2018.

Postponed due to bad weather (snow).  Game to be rescheduled for 17 March 2018.

Postponed due to bad weather (snow).  Game to be rescheduled for 5 May 2018.

Postponed due to bad weather (snow).  Game to be rescheduled for 31 March 2018.

Postponed due to bad weather (snow).  Game to be rescheduled for 17 March 2018.

Postponed due to bad weather (snow).  Game to be rescheduled for 29 March 2018.

Round 25

Rounds 14, 15, 21 & 24 (rescheduled games) 

Game rescheduled from 3 March 2018.

Game rescheduled from 3 February 2018.

Game rescheduled from 3 March 2018.

Game originally rescheduled from 3 March 2018 but postponed again due to waterlogged pitch caused by heavy rain.  Game to be rescheduled for 31 March 2018.

Game rescheduled from 9 December 2017.

Game rescheduled from 16 December 2017.

Round 26

Rounds 19, 22 & 24 (rescheduled games) 

Game rescheduled from 3 March 2018.

Game rescheduled from 20 January 2018.

Game rescheduled from 3 March 2018.

Game originally rescheduled from 3 March 2018 & then 17 March 2018 when it was postponed again.

Game rescheduled from 10 February 2018.

Originally rescheduled from 3 March 2018 but postponed again due to a waterlogged pitch caused by heavy rain.  Game to be rescheduled for 5 May 2018.

Round 27

Round 28

Postponed due to waterlogged pitch.  Game to be rescheduled for 5 May 2018.

Round 29

Sheffield are relegated.

Round 30

Blaydon are relegated.

Sale FC are champions.

Rounds 21 & 24 & 28 (rescheduled games)

Game rescheduled from 3 February 2018.

Game rescheduled from 3 March 2018 but cancelled as result would not adversely affect league standings. 

Game originally rescheduled from 3 March 2018 and then again from 31 March 2018.  Would eventually be cancelled as result would not adversely affect league standings.

Game rescheduled from 14 April 2018 but cancelled as result would not adversely affect league standings.

Round 24 (rescheduled game)

Game rescheduled from 3 March 2018.  Luctonians are relegated.

Promotion play-off
Each season, the runners-up in the National League 2 North and National League 2 South participate in a play-off for promotion to National Division 1.  Chinnor were runners up in the 2017–18 National League 2 South, and because they had a better record than the 2017–18 National League 2 North runners up, Sedgley Park, they host the play-off match.

Attendances
 Does not include promotion play-off.

Individual statistics
 Note that points scorers includes tries as well as conversions, penalties and drop goals. Appearance figures also include coming on as substitutes (unused substitutes not included). Does not include promotion play-off.

Top points scorers

Top try scorers

Season records

Team
Largest home win — 72 points
89 – 17 Stourbridge at home to Blaydon on 27 January 2018
Largest away win — 37 points (3)
40 – 3 Leicester Lions away to Luctonians on 14 October 2017
47 – 10 Sale FC away to Sheffield on 13 January 2018
37 – 0 Sale FC away to Macclesfield on 31 March 2018
Most points scored — 89 points 
89 – 17 Stourbridge at home to Blaydon on 27 January 2018
Most tries in a match — 14
Stourbridge at home to Blaydon on 27 January 2018
Most conversions in a match — 10 (2)
Sedgley Park at home to Sheffield on 21 April 2018
Sedgley Park at home to Sheffield Tigers on 28 April 2018
Most penalties in a match — 6 (2)
South Leicester at home to Tynedale on 21 October 2017
Huddersfield at home to Sedgley Park on 2 December 2017
Most drop goals in a match — 2
Wharfedale at home to Luctonians on 6 January 2018

Attendances
Highest — 1,820
Sheffield at home to Sheffield Tigers on 23 December 2017
Lowest — 57 
Sedgley Park at home to Otley on 17 March 2018
Highest average attendance — 542
Hinckley
Lowest average attendance — 115 
South Leicester

Player
Most points in a match — 35
 Stephen Collins for Sedgley Park at home to Sheffield Tigers on 28 April 2018
Most tries in a match - 5 
 Myles Bean for South Leicester at home to Blaydon on 21 April 2018
Most conversions in a match - 10
 Stephen Collins for Sedgley Park at home to Sheffield Tigers on 28 April 2018
Most penalties in a match — 6 (2)
 Rickie Aley for South Leicester at home to Tynedale on 21 October 2017
 Harry Davey for Huddersfield at home to Sedgley Park on 2 December 2017
Most drop goals in a match — 2
 Tom Barrett for Wharfedale at home to Luctonians on 6 January 2018

Notes

See also
 English rugby union system
 Rugby union in England

References

External links
 NCA Rugby

2017–18
4N